Tskhouk-Karckar or Qarqar is a group of pyroclastic cones which is located in the central part of the Siunik volcanic ridge at the border of Armenia and Azerbaijan  SE of Lake Sevan. The volcanoes lie on the northwest side of Tskhouk volcano and are constructed on a volcanic basement or rhyolites, basaltic andesites and dacites. The volcanoes erupted voluminous and long lava flows, grouped in three age-based stages of varying age and conservation. Petroglyphs have been found buried under the most recent stages and broken by earthquake activity, suggesting activity between the 4th–early 3rd millennium BC and 4720 ± 140 years BP, a date established by C14 analysis on graves inside the lava flows. There is evidence indicating that the last stage of activity resulted in abandonment of the area by humans, only resuming during the Middle Ages.

References 

Stratovolcanoes
Subduction volcanoes
Volcanoes of Armenia
Mountains of Armenia
Mountains of Azerbaijan
Volcanoes of Azerbaijan